Alec Raymond "Ray" Cashley (born 23 October 1951 in Bristol, England) is an English former professional football goalkeeper.

He joined Bristol City as a youth player and was their number one goalkeeper in the early 1970s despite starting his career as a fullback. He made his debut for Bristol City against Southampton in the FA Cup in 1970. In the 1975–76 season, City were promoted to the First Division but Cashley lost his place to John Shaw soon afterwards and had only brief spells in the side for the remainder of his time with City. Cashley even scored a goal for City on 18 September 1973, with a long clearance from his own penalty area against Hull City on a gusty night. In total, he made 262 appearances, 227 of those in the league for The Robins.

Cashley had a loan spell with Hereford United in 1981, making 20 league and 6 additional appearances for The Whites before playing for Clevedon Town.

In August 1982 he returned to professional football with Bristol Rovers, who he made 53 league appearances for. He then played for Trowbridge Town before again returning to The Football League when he joined Chester City in October 1985. Cashley made nine appearances as City were promoted from Division Four at the end of the season.

After Chester, City came calling yet again, offering Cashley a role in the reserves, albeit without a contract. He would be able to step in to play for City if Keith Waugh was unable and Cashley jumped at the chance for full-time football once again.

He subsequently played for non-league sides East Worle and Weston-super-Mare.

References

External links
Ray Cashley Bristol Statistics

1951 births
Living people
Footballers from Bristol
Bristol City F.C. players
Hereford United F.C. players
Bristol Rovers F.C. players
Chester City F.C. players
Clevedon Town F.C. players
Trowbridge Town F.C. players
Association football goalkeepers
English Football League players
English footballers
Weston-super-Mare A.F.C. players